Kalahandi is a district of Odisha in India.

Kalahandi may also refer to:

 Kalahandi State, a princely state of India during the British Raj
 Kalahandi (Lok Sabha constituency)
 Kalahandi Poem, Sahitya Akademi award winning work by Tapan Kumar Pradhan